Gerald Conrad Ritcey (March 19, 1914 – November 24, 2001) was a Canadian politician. He represented the electoral district of Colchester in the Nova Scotia House of Assembly from 1968 to 1974. He was a member of the Progressive Conservative Party of Nova Scotia.

Ritcey was born in Dartmouth, Nova Scotia. He was a merchant and businessman and lived in Truro. He married Mary MacPhee in 1940. Ritcey served in the Executive Council of Nova Scotia as Minister of Trade and Industry. Ritcey died in Truro on November 24, 2001. His grandson, Dave Ritcey, was elected as an MLA on March 10, 2020 to Truro-Bible Hill-Millbrook-Salmon River, a district that was previously part of Colchester.

References

1914 births
2001 deaths
Progressive Conservative Association of Nova Scotia MLAs
Members of the Executive Council of Nova Scotia
People from Dartmouth, Nova Scotia
People from Truro, Nova Scotia